Celal Adan (born 10 September 1951 in Ağrı) is a Turkish politician. He was elected in 2011 to the 24th Grand National Assembly of Turkey for the Nationalist Movement Party (MHP). Adan had previously represented the  True Path Party (DYP) in the 21st Assembly (1999 - 2002), and later been the party's deputy chairman (renamed Democratic Party in 2007).

In the 1980s and 1990s Adan had a close relationship with Mehmet Ağar; in the early 1980s he was tried and acquitted of being involved in the 1980 murder of trade unionist Kemal Türkler.

References 

1951 births
Living people
People from Ağrı
Nationalist Movement Party politicians
Democrat Party (Turkey, current) politicians
Istanbul University alumni
Deputies of Istanbul
Members of the 25th Parliament of Turkey
Members of the 21st Parliament of Turkey
Members of the 26th Parliament of Turkey